Elselina Johanna "Eljo" Kuiler (born 6 April 1946) is a former diver from the Netherlands. She competed at the 1968 Summer Olympics in springboard and finished in 16th place.

References

1946 births
Living people
Dutch female divers
Divers at the 1968 Summer Olympics
Olympic divers of the Netherlands
People from Enkhuizen
Sportspeople from North Holland
20th-century Dutch women